Gentiana cruciata, the star gentian or cross gentian, is a herbaceous perennial flowering plant in the Gentianaceae family.

Description
 Gentiana cruciata is a hemicryptophyte scapose plant of small size, reaching on average  in height. The flowers are violet-blue trumpets with 4 petals, clustered in the axils of upper leaves. The flowering period extends from June to August. The flowers are hermaphrodite and pollinated by insects (entomogamy). The fruit is a capsule. The seeds are dispersed by gravity alone (barochory).

Distribution
Gentiana cruciata is widespread in most of Europe (except Portugal, Great Britain and Scandinavia) and in Western Asia.

Habitat

Host for Phengaris rebeli
Phengaris rebeli is an endangered butterfly which feeds upon G. cruciata. Female P. rebeli lay their eggs on the upper side of G. cruciata leaves and three to four weeks later, the P. rebeli larvae emerge and begin to feed on the seeds and flowers of this grassland plant. After the P. rebeli reaches its fourth larval instar, it drops to the ground to be picked up by Myrmica schencki ants and brought to their nests.

Female P. rebeli prefer to lay eggs on G. cruciata growing in clumps rather than individual plants, and on the taller plants, as they are less shaded and allow the eggs to grow and develop faster.

Cultural Importance 
According to Hungarian legend, a pestilence spread throughout the kingdom during King Ladislaus's reign. Ladislaus prayed for a cure; he then shot an arrow into the air at random, hitting a star gentian plant which cured the illness. This plant became known as "Saint Ladislaus's herb" in Hungary.

Gallery

References

External links
 Gentiana cruciata
 Calphoto

cruciata
Flora of Europe
Flora of Western Asia
Plants described in 1753
Taxa named by Carl Linnaeus